The NORCECA qualification for the 2018 FIVB Volleyball Women's World Championship will see member nations compete for six places at the finals in Japan. USA has directly qualified to 2018 World Championship as the 2014 World Champion.

Pool compositions
34 NORCECA member nations would enter qualification. Canada, Mexico, Dominican Republic, Cuba, Puerto Rico, and Costa Rica directly qualify to the 2017 NORCECA Continental Championship.

CAZOVA and ECVA will have two rounds of qualification. The two highest seeded teams from each zone according to the January 1, 2016 NORCECA Continental Women's Senior Ranking directly qualifies to the second zonal round. The first zonal round will have three groups of four teams.

AFECAVOL zonal qualification will have single round-robin tournament. The top two teams will qualify to the 2017 NORCECA Continental Championship.

CAZOVA Zone
NORCECA Continental Women's Senior Ranking as of 1 January 2016 is shown in bracket.

First round

Second round

ECVA Zone

First round

Second round

St. Lucia was advanced to Final Round by NORCECA when the schedule for the NORCECA Continental Championships Group B schedule was released. St. Lucia was the highest ranking team and therefore was advanced to the Final Round of qualifying.

AFECAVOL Zone
Single round-robin tournament

First round

Group A
Venue:  Ronald Charles Arena, Saint Croix, U.S. Virgin Islands
Dates: 6–7 August 2016
All times are Atlantic Standard Time (UTC−04:00)

Group B
Venue:  Centro Deportivo Betico Croes, Oranjestad, Aruba
Dates: 26–27 November 2016
All times are Atlantic Standard Time (UTC−04:00)

Group C
Venue:  Clifton Hunter High School Sports Center, Grand Cayman, Cayman Islands
Dates: 12–13 November 2016
All times are Eastern Standard Time (UTC−05:00)

Group D
Venue:  L.B. Scot Sports Auditorium, Philipsburg, Sint Maarten
Dates: 6–7 August 2016
All times are Atlantic Standard Time (UTC−04:00)

Play off
Third placed match

First placed match

Standing

Group E
Venue:  YMCA Sports Complex, St. John's, Antigua and Barbuda
Dates: 9–10 September 2016
All times are Atlantic Standard Time (UTC−04:00)

Play off
First placed match

Standing

Group F
Venue:  Matthew François Sports Auditorium, Marigot, Saint Martin
Dates: 22–23 October 2016
All times are Atlantic Standard Time (UTC−04:00)

Play off
Third placed match

First placed match

Standing

Group K
Venue:  , Nicaragua
Dates: 30 November–4 December 2016
All times are Central Standard Time (UTC−06:00)

Second round

2017 CAZOVA Championship

Preliminary round

CAZOVA Pool D
Venue:  TBD, Jamaica
Dates: 26–28 July 2017

CAZOVA Pool E

Final round

7th–8th places

7th place match

Final six

Quarterfinals

Semifinals

5th place match

3rd place match

Final

Final standing

2017 ECVA Championship

Preliminary round

ECVA Group D
Venue:  YMCA Sports Complex, Saint John's, Antigua and Barbuda
Dates: September 7–10, 2017

ECVA Group E
Venue:  YMCA Sports Complex, Saint John's, Antigua and Barbuda
Dates: September 7–10, 2017

Final round

Final six

Quarterfinals

Semifinals

5th place match

3rd place

1st place

Final standing

NORCECA Continental Championship

Pool A

Pool B

Pool C

References

External links
Official website of the First Round

2016 in volleyball
2017 in women's volleyball
2018 FIVB Volleyball Women's World Championship